Radek Míka (born March 18, 1984) is a Czech professional ice hockey defenceman playing for Bisons de Neuilly-sur-Marne of the FFHG Division 1 in France. He previously played with HC Sparta Praha and HC Zlín in the Czech Extraliga.

References

External links

1984 births
Living people
HC Berounští Medvědi players
Bisons de Neuilly-sur-Marne players
Czech ice hockey defencemen
HC Dukla Jihlava players
BK Mladá Boleslav players
SK Horácká Slavia Třebíč players
HC Sparta Praha players
Ice hockey people from Prague
HC Stadion Litoměřice players
PSG Berani Zlín players
Czech expatriate ice hockey people
Expatriate ice hockey players in France
Czech expatriate sportspeople in France